José Melchor (born February 26, 1990 in Culiacán, Sinaloa) is a Mexican professional footballer who plays for Murciélagos  of Ascenso MX.

External links
Ascenso MX 

Liga MX players
Living people
Mexican footballers
1990 births
Sportspeople from Culiacán
Association footballers not categorized by position